Viktor Zakharevich Savelyev (2 February 1875 – 1943) was a Russian general. At the beginning of World War I, he was still a colonel. He was promoted to major general in 1915. He was a recipient of the Order of Saint Anna, the Order of Saint George, the Order of Saint Stanislaus (House of Romanov) and the Gold Sword for Bravery. After the October Revolution, he opposed the Bolsheviks and later emigrated to Bulgaria.

References

Bibliography
 . Гражданская война в России: Белые армии. — М., 2003. — (Военно-историческая библиотека)

External links
 
 Всероссийское генеалогическое древо.
 Казаки в зарубежье.

1875 births
1943 deaths
Russian military personnel of World War I
People of the Russian Civil War
Recipients of the Order of St. George of the Third Degree
Recipients of the Order of St. Anna, 3rd class
Recipients of the Order of Saint Stanislaus (Russian), 2nd class
Recipients of the Order of Saint Stanislaus (Russian), 3rd class
Recipients of the Gold Sword for Bravery
White Russian emigrants to Bulgaria